Hepsi Hit Vol. 2 (All Hits Vol. 2) is the thirteenth studio album by Turkish singer Hande Yener. It was released on 21 June 2017 by Poll Production.

Music and lyrics 
The fifth song in the album, "Vay", was found similar to Bendeniz's "Güzeller Güzeli" (Zaman, 2001). The album's ninth song, "Faili Meçhul", was compared by some critics to Daft Punk's "The Game of Love".

Critical reception 
Hürriyets Naim Dilmener praised the songs written by Mete Özgencil, but believed that the ones written and composed by Mert Ekren were not suitable for Yener, and added that Ekren had tried to use Altan Çetin's formula for Yener's previous albums in writing and composing the new pieces. Dilmener wrote that Hande Yener was a successful artist with the ability to release hit songs, but added that this album would not become a hit, just like its predecessor Hepsi Hit Vol. 1. He mentioned that Yener "should choose the names she will work with more carefully, and find a way to resist the constraints of the label owners." Habertürks Oben Burak praised Özgencil for his work on this album and added that it was "so full of good songs."

In his review for Hayat Müzik, Yavuz Hakan Tok wrote: "[In this album] Hande Yener could neither do what we wanted to see her do, nor was she was able to turn herself into what she thought she could become." He liked a part of the album, about which he said: "... in any case, if it was required to necessarily listen to Hande Yener, we could handle it with the likes of 'Ben En Çok', 'Leyla', 'Sana Bir Şey Olmaz', 'Faili Meçhul'. After that? Well, the next step is clear. This is Hande Yener, you know it: Everything changes in five minutes!" Tok also outlined many criticisms that were focused on the album's promotion and emphasized that choosing the name 'Hepsi Hit' for the album was not a good decision, describing the promotional campaign as "A sheer aggressive campaign focused on marketing their own products as 'good' by describing those of others as 'rotten'; a 'dirty' campaign, so to speak."

Music videos 
Three of the songs from Hepsi Hit Vol. 2 were turned into music videos. All three music videos were directed by Michael Garcia. The first music video, "Bakıcaz Artık", was recorded in Beverly Hills, Malibu and Hollywood, and released in May 2017. It was nominated for the Best Music Video award at the 44th Golden Butterfly Awards. The song itself was nominated for the Song of the Year award and ranked second on Turkey's official music chart. The second music video, "Benden Sonra", was recorded at the Ali AltaModa store in Şişli, where Yener used to work as a clerk in the 1990s before becoming famous. The music video was released in August. The album's third and final music video was made and released for the song "Vay".

Track listing

Charts

Release history

References

External links 
Hepsi Hit Vol. 2 – Discogs

2017 albums
Turkish-language albums
Hande Yener albums